Elections to the French National Assembly were held in the constituency of French Sudan−Niger on 2 June 1946 as part of the wider parliamentary elections. Two members were elected from two separate electoral colleges. A second round of voting was held in the first colleges on 16 June as no candidate received over 50% of the vote in the first round.

Results

First College

Second College

References

1946 in French Sudan
1946 in Niger
1946 06
1946 06
French Sudan